"Double Jeopardy: To Be Black and Female" is a 1969 Feminist pamphlet written by Frances M. Beal that critiques capitalism, reproductive rights, as well as social politicalization and its effects on the Black women identity and community. Beal's essay talks about the misconceptions and troubles that occur when trying to analyze the role of a Black woman in society. The pamphlet covers many different aspects of life and the levels of oppression placed upon Black women in the areas of capitalism, race, and gender. Additionally, the pamphlet includes principles outlined by The Third World Women’s Alliance (TWWA). In 1970 the pamphlet was revised then published in The Black Woman, an anthology edited by Toni Cade Bambara in 1970. A revised version was included in the 1970 anthology Sisterhood is Powerful: An Anthology of Writings From The Women's Liberation Movement, edited by Robin Morgan.

Frances M. Beal 
Frances M. Beal is a Black Feminist and activist. Her work focuses on civil rights, racial justice, peace and women’s rights. In 1958, she joined the NAACP, which began her journey in political activism. She then studied at the Sorbonne in France as a young woman. She was heavily influenced by the opposition students faced based on the colonial status of Algeria. She worked with the Student Nonviolent Coordinating Committee (SNCC) in the early 1960s. In 1968, she founded the Black Women’s Liberation Committee for the SNCC, which became the Third World Women’s Alliance. Beal is also a writer and has provided foundational writing to Black Feminist Thought. Some of her publications include "Slave of a Slave No More: Black Women in Struggle" and "The Making of a Black President."

"Economic Exploitation of Black Women" 
The first section of the pamphlet talks about the economics of Black women and how on average in 1969, a non-white woman made approximately three times less than a white man.  At the time, the wage scale for white men is $6,704, compared to the $2,861 Black women made. The capitalist system reduces Black women to level of enslavement. Men are exploited by capitalism as well, as they are given a level of superiority based on patriarchal beliefs. This superiority allows women to be exploited by the system. For example, Black women are given specific jobs as domestic and hospital workers, where employers can pay them less amounts of money than others in the same field. Beal thus exposes the concrete economic raison d'être of both racism and sexism. In other words, it pays, for some, to uphold such reactionary and divisive ideologies since the more a group of people is marginalized and discriminated against the easier it is to exploit their labor (to have a pool of low-waged workers). Beal draws several conclusions from this: 1) that the divisions created between workers because of the different pay rates are hindering the advancement of the workers' struggle as a whole because white workers do not readily question their privileges; 2) that, in the end, one has to see different forms of exploitation as related to one another if we want to get rid of them all; 3) and that an awareness of, and an end to the super-exploitation of Black workers, and women in particular, should be a priority in the fight against capitalism. "It is not an intellectual persecution alone; the movement is not a psychological outburst for us; it is quite real. We as Black women have got to deal with the problems that the Black masses deal with, for our problems in reality are one and the same," Beal said. Division in the workforce creates a labor hierarchy. The labor hierarchy can influence work environments and overall treatment of employees. Since the formation of slavery, Black women have been viewed solely on a level servitude. Black women have always been viewed as workers. The collection of these ideas has had a negative impact on the way they are treated in the years following, even in modern times. When describing the labor market as a whole, Nina Banks states the Black women have always had the highest level participation, regardless of age, marital status, or number of children. The essay discusses economic oppression of Black women from the perspective of racism. However, Beal did not analyze class oppression as an independent form of oppression.  Although the economic oppression of Black women was rooted in racism and sexism that historically constrained them to low wage jobs, Black women face multiple oppressions that impede their liberation. The essay discusses how capitalist system within the American society defined manhood. An individual is considered a real "man" if he has a good job, makes a lot of money and drives a fancy car. For more context on this concept of manhood, see The Negro Family: The Case For National Action. The essay argues that many Black women accepted this capitalist evaluation of manhood. This contributed to the strained relationship between the Black man and woman; Black women viewed Black men as lazy and explained this for their lack of employment.

"Bedroom Politics" 
In this section, Beal discusses the promotion of sterilization of non-white women in order to maintain population levels. Beal claims that the recent cry for birth control in both Black and non white neighborhoods was more of a surgical genocide trying to prevent those of the non-white background from reproducing and increasing in numbers. She outlines the difference between sterilization tactics for men and women. A vasectomy for men is simple procedure that only takes a couple minutes to complete. On the opposite end, women have to go through a surgical procedure, a salpingectomy, which involves anesthetics. It is classified as a major surgery because it requires the removal of a fallopian tube, as well as an overnight hospital stay. Beal explains how non-white women were used as scapegoats when the birth control pill was created in. Puerto Rican and Black women were used to evaluate how efficient the pill was. The creation of the birth control pill also led to "Maternity Clinics" to be placed in Black and Puerto Rican communities. Sterilization done in unethical ways during the 1970s was based on Eugenics. Eugenics is a set of beliefs that aim at population control. Populations considered less desirable, especially people of color and poor people, have been vastly affected by the oppressive actions of birth control.  The forced sterilization of Black women and women of color violated their reproductive rights and this influence Beal's formation of Third World Women's Alliance and struggle for Black women's liberation.  Beal discusses the lack of access to legal abortion for Black women and other women of color, thus threatening their health.  Rich white women were able to receive abortions with little to no struggle or interference from authorities. Black women were not granted this luxury. Their health was put in jeopardy due to oppressive actions to control the life process of human beings. Beal explains that Black women should be able to practice safe birth control methods, and be able to obtain legal abortions as basic principle of human and reproductive rights.  However, Black men were opposed to abortion for Black women because they considered abortion as genocide for Black people. "The elimination of these horrendous conditions will free Black women for full participation in the revolution, and there after, in the building of a new society," she states.

"Relation to the White Movement" 
Another section of the essay focuses on the troubled relationship between Black women and white women's movement. Black liberation groups for women were started in order to combine gender, race, and class politics. Beal uses this section to explain that the white women's liberation movement in the United States did not have the same objective in mind as Black women. The difference is due to the white women's movement being too middle class and not speaking up against racism. She explains that any group that does not have anti-racist and anti-imperialistic ideas will never understand the struggles Black women are up against. Those involved in white women liberation groups were mostly a part of the middle class. Therefore, they do not experience the economic exploitation faced by Black women. Beal explains that if white groups are not fighting against capitalism and racism, they do not have anything in common with the Black liberation groups at all. Moreover, white women's movement was insensitive to Black women's issues such as abortion rights, forced sterilization and welfare rights. White women focused solely on gender issues, negating the race and class aspects that effect Black women in the most oppressive ways. Ignoring the race and class aspects of oppression and how they affect Black women further adds to the obtuse nature regarding their struggles. White women's class and race aids in their privilege ultimately. The troubled relationship between Black women and white women's movement was also seen in feminist organizations such as Student Non-violent Coordinating Committee as around 1965, white women were moving from SNCC to a more upper-middle-class Students for Democratic Society.

"The New World" 
The final part of the essay focuses on the new world in which Beal discusses male supremacy within the black liberation movement. Beal discusses that Black people, especially Black men, have to take a closer look at what type of world they want to live in, and actively fight for it to be created. Once Black women are free from the bonds of oppression, freedom can be achieved for everyone. "Unless women in any enslaved nation are completely liberated, the change cannot be really called a liberation," she said. This type of liberation requires active participation from the Black community as whole, meaning Black men and women have to come together in order to gain liberation. The pamphlet discusses the need for the Black liberation movement to address the issues Black women face. "This will mean changing the traditional routines that we have established as a result of living in total corrupting society. It means changing how you relate to your wife, your husband, your parents and your coworkers," she explained.  The essay discusses the need to eliminate all forms of oppressions within society and the importance of Black women to be at the forefront of the Black liberation movement. This pamphlet played an important role in the Black rights movement for women and Black feminist scholarship. Beal's essay also influenced Black feminist organizations such as the SNCC and TWWA. Beal influenced TWWA naming its newspaper Triple Jeopardy, and adopted an analysis of Black women's oppression through lenses of race, class and gender.

References

External links
"Double Jeopardy: To Be Black and Female"
https://www.epi.org/blog/black-womens-labor-market-history-reveals-deep-seated-race-and-gender-discrimination/
https://powertodecide.org/news/black-women-and-contraceptive-care

Black feminist books
Feminist books
Intersectional feminism
Pamphlets
1969 non-fiction books
Literature by African-American women